

Champions

Major League Baseball
World Series: New York Yankees over Brooklyn Dodgers (4-1)
All-Star Game, July 12 at Ebbets Field: American League, 11-7

Caribbean leagues
Cuba : Alacranes del Almendares
Panama : Spur Cola  Colonites
Puerto Rico : Indios de Mayagüez 
Venezuela : Cervecería Caracas.

Caribbean World Series
Cuba : Alacranes del Almendares

Other champions
All-American Girls Professional Baseball League: Rockford Peaches
College World Series: Texas
Little League World Series: Hammonton, New Jersey
Negro League Baseball All-Star Game : East, 4–0
Winter Leagues
1949 Caribbean Series: Alacranes del Almendares
Cuban League: Alacranes del Almendares
Mexican Pacific League: Tacuarineros de Culiacán
Panamanian League: Spur Cola  Colonites
Puerto Rican League: Indios de Mayagüez
Venezuelan League: Cervecería Caracas

Awards and honors
Baseball Hall of Fame
Mordecai Brown
Charlie Gehringer
Kid Nichols
Most Valuable Player
Ted Williams (AL)
Jackie Robinson (NL)
Rookie of the Year
Roy Sievers (AL)
Don Newcombe (NL)
The Sporting News Player of the Year Award
Ted Williams (AL) – OF, Boston Red Sox
The Sporting News Manager of the Year Award
Casey Stengel (AL) – New York Yankees

MLB statistical leaders

Major league baseball final standings

American League final standings

National League final standings

Events

January
January 12 – The New York Giants are fined $2,000, and manager Leo Durocher $500, for signing Freddie Fitzsimmons as a coach while he was still under contract to the Boston Braves. Fitzsimmons gets a $500 fine and a 30-day spring training suspension.
January 25 – Lou Boudreau is rewarded for the Cleveland Indians' championship with a two-year, $65,000 annual contract as player-manager.
January 27 – Fred Saigh buys out the interest of Robert Hannegan and now controls 90 percent of the St. Louis Cardinals stock. Saigh and Hannegan had swung the deal in 1947 with only $60,300 in cash in a $4 million deal. Hannegan came out with $866,000 profit in two years.
January 28 – The New York Giants sign their first black players, Negro leaguers Monte Irvin (OF) and Ford Smith (P). They are assigned to minor league Jersey City. Irvin will star for the Giants, but Smith never makes the major leagues.
January 29 – The Pittsburgh Pirates get Murry Dickson from the St. Louis Cardinals for $125,000.

February
February 2 – Brothers Bill DeWitt and Charlie DeWitt gain control of the St. Louis Browns by acquiring 57 percent of the stock from Richard Muckerman for $One Million.
February 7 – Outfielder Joe DiMaggio signs with the New York Yankees for $100,000, the first six-figure contract in Major League history.
February 9 – A federal appeals court orders the $300,000 suit against Major League Baseball by Mexican League jumper Danny Gardella back to a lower court for trial.
February 20 – The first Caribbean Series ever was inaugurated with a doubleheader at Havana, Cuba. In the first game, Indios de Mayagüez of Puerto Rico faced Spur Cola  Colonites of Panama, while the Cuban host team Alacranes del Almendares faced Cervecería Caracas of Venezuela in the night cap. The Cuban club would win the best-of-six-days Series with a perfect 6–0 record, followed by Venezuela (3–3), Panama (2–4) and Puerto Rico (1–5).

March
March 1 – The St. Louis Browns, owners of Sportsman's Park, move to evict the St. Louis Cardinals in order to gain a rental increase.
March 2 – Joe DiMaggio leaves the New York Yankees' spring training camp to have an ailing right heel examined at Johns Hopkins Hospital. DiMaggio is told that no surgery is needed and he returns to Florida, but the heel will continue to bother him. The star is hitting just 7-for-31 in the Grapefruit League.
March 8 – Max Lanier and Fred Martin, late of the Mexican League, file a $2.5 million suit against Major League Baseball. A federal judge on April one will deny their right to be reinstated.

April
April 8 – Dissension rumors surround the NL title-holder Boston Braves after manager Billy Southworth calls a closed meeting of the club in a South Carolina hotel.
April 18 – On Opening Day, the Philadelphia Phillies win 4–0 over the Boston Braves at Braves Field, and the Washington Senators defeat the Philadelphia Athletics 3–2 at Griffith Stadium.
April 19:
At pregame ceremonies marking the season opener in Yankee Stadium, a granite monument to the late Babe Ruth is unveiled in center field. Plaques honoring Lou Gehrig and Miller Huggins are also presented. Mrs. Babe Ruth, Mayor William O'Dwyer, and Governor Thomas E. Dewey are at the game.
In Brooklyn, the Dodgers pay tribute to Jack "Shorty" Laurice, the "number one" fan and leader of the Ebbets Field "Sym-phony" band. Laurice died in 1948.
Before 53,000 at Tiger Stadium, Detroit Tigers rookie Johnny Groth homers twice in his first three at-bats against the Chicago White Sox.
April 20 – Philadelphia Phillies third baseman Willie Jones hits four consecutive doubles, tying an NL mark with Dick Bartell (1933) and Ernie Lombardi (1935).
April 24 – Lloyd Merriman of the Cincinnati Reds hits a home run and a triple in his first major league game.
April 28 – A New York fan charges Leo Durocher with assault after the Giants lose 15–2 to Brooklyn. Commissioner Happy Chandler suspends Durocher but he is absolved on May 3. Chandler criticizes teams for lax security that allows fans on the field.
April 30 – Rocky Nelson hits an "inside-the-glove" two-run home run in short center-left field to turn a ninth inning 3–1 Chicago Cubs lead into a 4–3 St. Louis Cardinals victory. Cubs center fielder Andy Pafko's catch is ruled a trap by umpire Al Barlick, as Pafko races in, holding the ball high as runners circle the bases.

May
May 1 – Elmer Valo becomes the first AL player to hit two bases-loaded triples in a game when he leads the Philadelphia Athletics to a 15–9 win in the first of two games against the Washington Senators. Valo will have a third bases-loaded triple during the season, to tie the AL mark of Shano Collins set in 1918. The A's take game 2, 7–3, called after seven innings.
 Appearing as a pinch hitter for Carl Furillo, Chuck Connors, making his major league debut, hits into a double play. After his career is aborted by injury, Connors would go on to greater fame starring on the T.V. show The Rifleman.  
May 3 – Taking advantage of the shortened fence installed by Chicago White Sox GM Frank Lane, the Washington Senators belt seven home runs – and need them all – in beating Chicago, 14–12 in 10 innings. This is the first time in MLB history a team has collected seven homers in an extra-inning contest. Clyde Vollmer leads the hit parade with a pair, followed by Mark Christman, Gil Coan, Al Evans, Eddie Robinson and Bud Stewart. The Sox get homers from Joe Tipton and Gus Zernial.
May 4:
Chicago White Sox infielder Floyd Baker, who will play 874 games in his 13-year major league career, hits his only career home run off pitcher Sid Hudson, into "Home Run Lane", named for the new fence installed by Sox GM Frank Lane, in an 8–7 loss to the Washington Senators.
A day after the two teams played to a 13-inning, 14-14 tie, the Detroit Tigers beat the Boston Red Sox 5–1 behind Virgil Trucks' three-hitter. The Tigers shell Boston pitcher Mickey Harris for 14 hits in five 2/3 innings.
May 5:
Charlie Gehringer, star second baseman of the Detroit Tigers from 1925 though 1941, is selected for the Baseball Hall of Fame. Two days later, the Old-Timers committee will select Kid Nichols and Mordecai Brown.
At the Polo Grounds, Johnny Mize pounds a 10th-inning home run and the New York Giants beat the Pittsburgh Pirates 3–2 to sweep their three-game series. The homer off Murry Dickson is the 300th for Mize. Reliever Hank Behrman, in for Sheldon Jones, pitches out of tight jams in the 9th and 10th innings to win the game. Wally Westlake is stranded in the 10th after reaching Behrman for a leadoff triple.
Before the start of a series with the New York Yankees, the Chicago White Sox abandon their trick left-field fence. The 5-foot chicken wire fence, erected to cut the distance by 20 feet, resulted in 11 home runs in eight games, but opponents hit seven of them. The AL will subsequently rule that fences cannot be moved more than once a season. The Yankees still win today, 7–5, to go 13–3. Tommy Henrich has the only homer, while Johnny Lindell, Yankees left fielder, twice makes catches that would've cleared the wire fence. Allie Reynolds, with help from Joe Page, is the winning pitcher.
At Cleveland, Bob Feller, making his first start since pitching two innings in the season opener and coming up with a sore shoulder, beats the Boston Red Sox 7–3. Cleveland scores six runs in the second inning, including a three-run home run by Ken Keltner off Jack Kramer. On the next pitch, rookie Minnie Miñoso, making his second start, hits his first major-league homer. Ted Williams and Bobby Doerr hit 8th-inning homers for the Red Sox, while Joe Gordon adds a homer in the 5th for Cleveland.
The Boston Red Sox acquire Al Zarilla from the St. Louis Browns for Stan Spence and cash consideration.
May 6 – Philadelphia Athletics pitcher Bobby Shantz makes a sensational debut, tossing nine hitless innings in relief in a 13-inning 5–4 Athletics win over the Detroit Tigers. Shantz finally gives up two hits and a run in the 13th, but old-timer Wally Moses, now back with the A's, saves him with a two-run home run in the bottom of the 13th.
May 8:
At Shibe Park, the Cincinnati Reds score five runs in the ninth inning to take a 7–3 lead, but the Philadelphia Phillies tie to go into extra innings. Cincinnati then scores seven runs in the 12th to win 14–7.
May 8 – Longtime St. Louis Cardinals owner Sam Breadon dies. Robert Hannegan, the man to whom he sold the club, will die on October 6.
May 9:
At Tiger Stadium, the Detroit Tigers set back the first-place New York Yankees 4–1, behind the five-hit pitching of Ted Gray. Vic Raschi also allows just five hits, including a home run by Dick Wakefield, in taking the loss.
The first-place New York Giants win their seventh game in a row as pitcher Sheldon Jones stops the Chicago Cubs 7–2. Aided by ten walks and home runs by Sid Gordon and Willard Marshall, the Giants pin the loss on starter Ralph Hamner, who allows one hit in three innings.
May 14 – Roy Sievers hits a home run and a double to drive in four runs, leading the St. Louis Browns' 8–3 victory over the Detroit Tigers. Slick-fielding Detroit first baseman Paul Campbell ties a major league record by making two unassisted double plays. While with minor league Montreal in 1941, Campbell started 26 DPs at 1B.
May 15 – In the first game of a doubleheader at Comiskey Park, Chicago White Sox pitchers Bill Wight and Al Gettel shut out the Cleveland Indians 10–0 and 2–0.
Boston Braves pitcher Vern Bickford stops the Brooklyn Dodgers 4–0, allowing just four singles. One is by Gil Hodges, extending his hitting streak to 17 games. Jim Russell switch-hits a home run and double to pin the loss on Morrie Martin. The Braves start Al Lakeman at first base in place of Earl Torgeson, who separated his shoulder yesterday when he attempted to block Jackie Robinson on a double play. Torgeson will be operated on tomorrow and will be sidelined several months.
May 16 – The Chicago Cubs receive infielder Bob Ramazzotti from the Brooklyn Dodgers in exchange for IF Harry Schenz and $25,000.
May 22 – Brooklyn Dodgers pitcher Don Newcombe makes his first major league start a dandy, shutting out the Cincinnati Reds 3–0 in the first game of a doubleheader at Crosley Field. It's the first shutout in an NL debut in eleven years and extends Brooklyn's win streak at Cincinnati to 19 games going back to June 1947. Newcombe gives up hits to the first two batters, then allows just three more hits while walking none. He drives in two runs as well. In the second game, Ken Raffensberger then matches Newcombe by firing a one-hitter to beat Brooklyn 2–0, tossing only 83 pitches. The only hit is a leadoff single by Gil Hodges in the eighth inning. Raffensberger pitched two one-hitters against the Dodgers in the 1948 season.
May 24 – Striking out the last six St. Paul batters, Mickey McDermott of minor league Louisville fans a total of 20 for a new league record. McDermott wins 3–1, striking out the side in the 3rd, 5th, 6th, 8th, and 9th innings.
May 27 – The Cleveland Indians start the season so badly, 12–17, that owner Bill Veeck arranges a "Second Opening Day." Behind pitcher Al Benton, Cleveland make it a success, beating the Chicago White Sox 4–0. The Indians do rise to second place, within two 1/2 games of the top, but they will finish third, eight games back.
May 28 – Chicago White Sox rookie left fielder Gus Zernial breaks his collarbone making a diving catch against the Cleveland Indians. He will be out of action for two months. Cleveland push across a run in the ninth inning against Howie Judson to take a 3–2 victory. Early Wynn is the winning pitcher.

June
June 2 –  At Shibe Park, the Philadelphia Phillies hit five home runs during the same inning (the 8th) in a 12–3 victory over the Cincinnati Reds, tying the major league mark set by the 1939 New York Giants. Andy Seminick belts two, while Del Ennis, Willie Jones and Schoolboy Rowe have one each. Jones adds a triple as Granny Hamner's double jumps the extra bases total to 18, still a record. Seminick collects three HR overall.
June 5 – Commissioner Happy Chandler lifts the ban on all players who jumped to the Mexican League, starting in 1946. Only Sal Maglie will make a significant mark after the exile. Lou Klein will be the first jumper to make a major-league box score, successfully pinch-hitting on June 16.
June 9 – Philadelphia Athletics pitcher Dick Fowler records nine putouts in a 12-inning 1–0 victory over the Chicago White Sox.
June 10 – Frank Frisch, who began the season as coach of the New York Giants, replaces Charlie Grimm as manager of the last-place Chicago Cubs.
June 13 – In a trade of catchers, the New York Giants send Walker Cooper to the Cincinnati Reds in exchange for Ray Mueller.
June 15:
Eddie Waitkus of the Philadelphia Phillies is shot by 19-year-old Ruth Steinhagen at Chicago's Edgewater Beach Hotel. She will later be placed in a mental hospital. Waitkus battles for his life and will come back to play the following season.
San Francisco Seals rookie outfielder Dino Restelli joins the Pittsburgh Pirates and hits seven home runs in his first 39 at-bats. He will finish with 12, hitting .250 in 72 games, and is out of the NL the next year.
June 16 – The Boston Braves bring up 19-year-old Del Crandall from International League Evansville and make him their regular catcher.
June 26 – At Yankee Stadium, Pat Mullin of the Detroit Tigers hits three home runs in a Detroit 12–4 win over the New York Yankees.
June 28 – After missing the first 69 games of the season because of an ailing heel, Joe DiMaggio returns to the New York Yankees lineup with a single and a home run to beat the Boston Red Sox 6–4 in a night game at Fenway Park. DiMaggio will hit four homers in a three-game sweep.
June 29 – Mickey Owen and Luis Olmo rejoin the Brooklyn Dodgers from Mexican League exile.

July
July 3 – At the Polo Grounds, New York Giants pitcher Monte Kennedy hits a grand slam and shuts out the Brooklyn Dodgers 16–0.
July 4 – At Ebbets Field, the Brooklyn Dodgers increase their lead to two games over the St. Louis Cardinals by winning the twin bill from the Philadelphia Phillies, 7–1 and 8–4, while St. Louis divides with the Chicago Cubs at Wrigley Field.
July 6 – Cincinnati Reds catcher Walker Cooper, acquired recently from the Giants, collects six hits in seven at-bats, including three home runs with 10 RBI, and scores five times in a 23–4 Cincinnati victory over the Chicago Cubs.
July 7 – New York Giants pitcher Dave Koslo hits the first two home runs of his career while beating the Philadelphia Phillies 11–3 at the Polo Grounds.
July 8 – Hank Thompson and Monte Irvin are the first black players in Giants franchise history. Thompson starts at second base, and Irvin pinch-hits in the eighth inning. Thompson was also the first black to play for the St. Louis Browns in 1947, 12 days after Larry Doby's AL debut with the Cleveland Indians.
July 12 – The National League commits five errors, allowing the American League to record an 11–7 triumph in the All-Star Game at Ebbets Field. The contest marks the first appearance of black players: Jackie Robinson, Roy Campanella and Don Newcombe in the NL lineup and Larry Doby among the AL stars.
July 24:
The St. Louis Cardinals beat the Brooklyn Dodgers 14–1. This win gives St. Louis three straight victories at Ebbets Field, as they take over the lead Brooklyn has held through most of the season.
July 26 – Philadelphia Athletics outfielder Wally Moses gets his 2,000th career hit off Joe Ostrowski of the St. Louis Browns.
July 28:
A 12-for-25 run raises Jackie Robinson's NL-leading average to .364. He will win the batting title at .342.
Detroit Tigers pitcher Dizzy Trout hits a ninth-inning grand slam against the Washington Senators as the Tigers win 13–7 at Griffith Stadium.
July 31 – At Crosley Field, Sid Gordon of the New York Giants blasts two home runs in the second inning of game two, as the Giants sweep the Cincinnati Reds, 10–0 and 9–0, behind pitchers Larry Jansen and Adrián Zabala.

August
August 6 – Luke Appling appears in his 2,154th game as a shortstop, surpassing the major league mark set by Rabbit Maranville. Appling will finish his career with 2,218 games at SS.
August 8 – Carl Furillo returns to the Brooklyn Dodgers lineup after an injury and hits .431 in the final eight weeks of the season. He will finish at .322, fourth best in the NL.
August 9 – Dom DiMaggio's 34-game hitting streak is on the line against Vic Raschi and the New York Yankees. Hitless in his first four at-bats, Dom hits a sinking line drive in the eighth inning that his brother Joe catches at his shoetops. The Boston Red Sox win 6–3 to move 5½ games behind the Yankees. Dom had started his streak after going hitless against Raschi.
August 15 – Reports of clubhouse troubles trail the Boston Braves all season. Owner Lou Perini prevails on manager Billy Southworth to take a leave of absence. The team spurts briefly under Johnny Cooney but finishes under .500, in fourth place. Braves players vote Southworth only a half-share of last year's World Series earnings but commissioner Happy Chandler restores the full share.
August 21 – A barrage of bottles from the Shibe Park stands as protest of a decision by umpire George Barr over a trapped fly ball results in the first forfeiture in the major leagues in seven years. The New York Giants, who receive this 4–0 forfeit over the Philadelphia Phillies, gave one away in 1942 when hordes of youngsters invaded the Polo Grounds field.
August 22 – The New York Giants sell veteran slugger Johnny Mize to the New York Yankees for $40,000.
August 27 – Former Mexican League jumpers Max Lanier and Fred Martin drop their $2.5 million suit against Major League Baseball.

September
September 3 – In American Association action, Columbus Red Birds pitcher Cot Deal started and completed a twenty-inning game against the Louisville Colonels. In addition to winning the game and giving up one earned run during the 20 innings, Deal collected four hits in eight at-bats.
September 9 – Despite terrorizing the NL with his bat and baserunning during the season, Jackie Robinson is picked off base by Dave Koslo, the fourth time this year New York Giants pitchers have nabbed him.
September 13 – For the second time in his career, Ralph Kiner hits home runs in four consecutive at bats, over two games. Kiner performed the same feat in 1947. The two home runs today are numbers 33 and 34. Kiner's 1949 total will include 25 on the road, 29 at Forbes Field, 14 of them in the bullpen enclosure still known as Greenberg Gardens.
September 15 – Pittsburgh Pirates pitcher Tiny Bonham dies following an appendectomy and stomach surgery at the age of 36, just 18 days after his last pitching performance, an 8–2 victory over the Philadelphia Phillies. Mrs. Bonham will receive the first benefits under the players pension plan, $90 a month for 10 years.
September 20 – Jackie Robinson steals home in a 5–0 Brooklyn Dodgers victory against the Chicago Cubs. It is his fifth steal of home this year and the 13th in his three years in the NL. That is the most in the majors since Ben Chapman stole his 15th and last in 1940, his 11th season.
September 24:
Boston Braves third baseman Bob Elliott hits three successive home runs as the Braves down the Giants 6–4.
At Fenway Park, Ellis Kinder pitches a six-hit shutout and Ted Williams lines his 42nd home run to beat the New York Yankees 2–0 and pull the Red Sox one game behind New York. Kinder is 15-1 at Fenway this season.
September 25:
The St. Louis Cardinals, in first place for two months, win their final home game, and the Dodgers lose to the Phillies, maintaining the Cards' 1½ game lead.
Despite 71 injuries that kept players out of games, Casey Stengel and his New York Yankees have been in first place all season. But today the Boston Red Sox move into a tie for first place with a 4–1 victory over Allie Reynolds. Ted Williams hits his 43rd home run, and Mel Parnell wins his 25th game of the season. Parnell is 16-3 at Fenway Park this year. Joe DiMaggio listens to the game from a hospital, bedridden with pneumonia. The Yankees return to New York and are greeted at Grand Central Station by a huge crowd of fans, including Mrs. Babe Ruth, who predicts, "Whoever wins tomorrow should go all the way."
September 26 – Before 67,434 at Yankee Stadium, the Boston Red Sox survive a rhubarb-filled 7–6 win when Johnny Pesky scores on a disputed squeeze play. Leading by one game, the Red Sox will visit the Washington Senators in a three-game series before their last two games of the year against the New York Yankees.
September 27 – The Boston Red Sox, winners of 16 out of the last 19 with the Senators, win the opener at Griffith Stadium 6–4.
September 28:
Facing Ray Scarborough, the Senators' top pitcher, the Boston Red Sox take a 1–0 lead into the ninth inning only to have the Senators tie it up. Mel Parnell, in relief for Boston, bounces a curve ball past catcher Birdie Tebbetts, and the winning run scores from third base.
The New York Yankees, taking 2 out of 3 games from the Philadelphia Athletics, stay one game behind the Boston Red Sox with two games left.
Called up from Triple-A Toronto in mid-September, Ed Sanicki of the Phillies gets his third hit of the season. All three are home runs. On September 14, Sanicki had homered with two men on his first big-league at bat, against Rip Sewell of the Pittsburgh Pirates.
September 29 – The St. Louis Cardinals lose 7-2 to former Redbird Murry Dickson, now with the Pittsburgh Pirates, following a Red Munger defeat. The Dodgers take two games from the Braves and a half-game lead in the NL.
September 30:
The Boston Red Sox outlast the Washington Senators 11-9 to move into New York for the showdown for the AL pennant.
Ralph Kiner hits his 54th home run, his 16th in September, as the Pittsburgh Pirates beat Herm Wehmeier and the Cincinnati Reds 3–2. Kiner's monthly total eclipses Cy Williams' 1923 NL mark.

October
Coming into the last weekend of the season, the Boston Red Sox are one game ahead of the New York Yankees, with the only games left for those teams being two against each other, thus there can be no playoff for the American League pennant. The Red Sox need to win only one of those games, but the Yankees win both to take the pennant. The Yankees will go on to win 14 pennants in the 16-year stretch from 1949 through 1964.
October 2 - On the same day the Yankees won the pennant, the Brooklyn Dodgers won the National League Pennant with a 9-7 10 inning game over the Philadelphia Philles, The Dodgers score those 2 runs in inning ten, that was important for "Dem Bums" as the second place St Louis Cardinals also won in a 13-5 win over the Chicago Cubs. Therefore the Dodgers won the pennant by one game
October 9 – The New York Yankees defeat the Brooklyn Dodgers, 10-6, in Game 5 of the World Series, to win their twelfth World Championship, four games to one. This is the second time in three years the Yankees have defeated the Dodgers in the series.
October 19 – Three weeks after acquiring Venezuelan shortstop Chico Carrasquel from the Brooklyn Dodgers organization for two minor leaguers and cash consideration‚ the Chicago White Sox steal second baseman Nellie Fox from the Philadelphia Athletics in exchange for backup catcher Joe Tipton. For the next six seasons, Carrasquel and Fox will develop a nice chemistry as a double play combination around second base.

November
November 18 – Brooklyn Dodgers infielder Jackie Robinson, who hit 16 home runs with 124 RBI and led the National League with a .342 batting average, becomes the first African American to win the Most Valuable Player Award. Stan Musial, Ralph Kiner, and teammate Pee Wee Reese are the runners-up.
November 21 – Bill Veeck sells the Cleveland Indians for $2.2 million to a local syndicate headed by Ellis Ryan. Hank Greenberg will be the new general manager.
November 25 – Boston Red Sox left fielder Ted Williams, who lost the Triple Crown when his batting average was .0002 below that of George Kell, wins the American League MVP Award with 13 of 22 first place votes, with the rest of the votes going to Phil Rizzuto (5), Joe Page (3) and Mel Parnell (1).
November 26 – In Japanese baseball, the Central League is joined by the Pacific League.

December
December 1 – Attendance in the major league parks is $20.2 Million, down from $20.9 Million in 1948. The New York Yankees and the Cleveland Indians each finish with over $2.2 Million, but the St. Louis Browns fall to $270,000.

Movies
Take Me Out to the Ball Game
The Stratton Story
It Happens Every Spring
The Kid from Cleveland

Births

January
January 3 – Ike Brookens
January 3 – Gary Lavelle
January 4 – Dennis Saunders
January 8 – Wilbur Howard
January 13 – Mike Buskey
January 13 – Jim Foor
January 15 – Luis Alvarado
January 15 – Bobby Grich
January 19 – Ramón de los Santos
January 22 – Mike Caldwell
January 29 – Jim Tyrone
January 31 – Mark Ballinger
January 31 – Fred Kendall
January 31 – Jim Willoughby

February
February 3 – Bake McBride
February 4 – Steve Brye
February 6 – Richie Zisk
February 9 – John Andrews
February 9 – John Young
February 11 – Ben Oglivie
February 12 – Ray Corbin
February 12 – Enzo Hernández
February 12 – Lenny Randle
February 14 – Larry Fritz
February 16 – Bob Didier
February 18 – John Mayberry
February 18 – Jerry Morales
February 27 – John Wockenfuss
February 28 – Jim Kremmel

March
March 3 – Jesse Jefferson
March 8 – Juan Jiménez
March 13 – Dennis O'Toole
March 15 – Jim Kern
March 21 – Don Durham
March 22 – Terry Wilshusen
March 23 – Jim Geddes
March 26 – Roger Hambright
March 28 – Frank Snook
March 30 – Terry Cox

April
April 8 – Mac Scarce
April 9 – Sam Ewing
April 10 – Tom Lundstedt
April 10 – Pete Varney
April 15 – Ray Bare
April 23 – Bob O'Brien
April 26 – Bruce Ellingsen
April 27 – Greg Kosc
April 30 – Phil Garner

May
May 2 – Steve Grilli
May 4 – Pat Osburn
May 11 – Jerry Martin
May 13 – Terry Hughes
May 15 – Steve Dunning
May 16 – Rick Reuschel
May 18 – Chris Ward
May 22 – Mike Eden
May 26 – Ed Crosby
May 27 – Terry Collins

June
June 2 – Jack Pierce
June 6 – Jim Deidel
June 15 – Dusty Baker
June 16 – Bob Rauch
June 17 – Brian Ostrosser
June 18 – Dave Schneck
June 19 – Jerry Reuss
June 22 – Ron Hodges
June 22 – Dave Tomlin
June 23 – Dave Goltz
June 28 – Don Baylor

July
July 7 – Tim Nordbrook
July 9 – Steve Luebber
July 11 – Jack Heidemann
July 11 – Stan Thomas
July 17 – Herb Hutson
July 19 – Gene Locklear
July 21 – Al Hrabosky
July 22 – Tim Johnson
July 25 – Santiago Guzmán
July 26 – David Vincent
July 28 – Vida Blue
July 31 – Jay Schlueter

August
August 4 – Terry Humphrey
August 6 – Mike Reinbach
August 9 – Ted Simmons
August 10 – Tom Brown
August 10 – Jimmy McMath
August 11 – Luis Meléndez
August 13 – Andre Thornton
August 18 – Charlie Hudson
August 19 – Paul Mitchell
August 22 – Doug Bair
August 25 – Bob Babcock

September
September 1 – Gary Ignasiak
September 1 – Garry Maddox
September 4 – Paul Jata
September 6 – Mike Thompson
September 9 – Reggie Sanders
September 13 – Rick Dempsey
September 13 – Jim Obradovich
September 15 – Don Carrithers
September 15 – Dave Pagan
September 16 – Mike Garman
September 16 – Roger Moret
September 24 – Don Kirkwood
September 27 – Mike Schmidt
September 28 – Mario Guerrero
September 29 – Steve Busby
September 30 – Ike Blessitt

October
October 2 – Greg Pryor
October 3 – Jim Breazeale
October 3 – Steve Foucault
October 4 – John Wathan
October 5 – Danny Fife
October 8 – Enos Cabell
October 9 – Steve Palermo
October 10 – Larry Lintz
October 10 – Rob Sperring
October 11 – Bobby Jones
October 16 – Don Hood
October 18 – Ed Farmer
October 18 – George Hendrick
October 21 – Skip James
October 23 – Greg Thayer
October 26 – Mike Hargrove
October 26 – Steve Rogers
October 27 – Jim Burton

November
November 16 – Leon Brown
November 20 – Ron Cash
November 22 – Rich Chiles
November 28 – Dave Augustine

December
December 2 – Jay Kleven
December 11 – Craig Caskey
December 14 – Bill Buckner
December 20 – Cecil Cooper
December 20 – Oscar Gamble
December 21 – Larry Bradford
December 24 – Frank Taveras
December 27 – Chico Escárrega
December 28 – John Milner

Deaths

January
January   1 – Hans Rasmussen, 53, pitcher who played for the Chicago Whales during the 1915 season.
January   4 – Joe Evers, 57, pinch-runner who appeared in just one game for the 1913 New York Giants.
January   5 – Ralph Edwards, 66, second baseman for the 1915 Philadelphia Athletics.
January   9 – Harry McIntire, 69, pitcher who played from 1905 through 13 for the Brooklyn Superbas, Chicago Cubs and Cincinnati Reds, who posted a 13-9  record with a 3.07 ERA and 10 complete games in 1910, to help Chicago win the 1910 National League pennant.
January 21 – Russ Ennis, 51, catcher who played for the Washington Senators in the 1926 season. 
January 23 – Walt Herrell, 69, pitcher for the 1911 Washington Senators.
January 26 − Hugh Bradley, 63, first baseman who played for the Boston Red Sox, Pittsburgh Rebels, Brooklyn Tip-Tops and Newark Pepper in a span of four seasons from 1910–1915, including the 1912 World Champion Red Sox.
January 28 – Frank Naleway, 46, shortstop who played with the Chicago White Sox in 1924.

February
February   4 – Pat Martin, 54, pitcher who played for the Philadelphia Athletics in the 1920 season. 
February   8 – John Carden, 27,  pitcher for the 1946 New York Giants. 
February 10 – Johnny Bates, 66, outfielder who played from 1906 to 1914 for the Boston Beaneaters, Boston Doves, Philadelphia Phillies, Cincinnati Reds, Chicago Cubs and Baltimore Terrapins, as well is a member of the select list of players who hit a home run in their first MLB at bat.
February 15 – Tommy Raub, 78, backup catcher who played for the Chicago Cubs and St. Louis Cardinals in part of two seasons spanning 1903–1906.
February 18 – Marty O'Toole, 60, pitcher who played with the Cincinnati Reds, Pittsburgh Pirates and New York Giants in a span of five seasons from 1908 to 1914.
February 20 – Norm Baker, 85, who pitched for the Pittsburgh Alleghenys, Louisville Colonels and Baltimore Orioles of the National League in three seasons between 1883 and 1890.	
February 24 – Ted Scheffler, 84, outfielder who played in 1888 with the Detroit Wolverines and for the Rochester Broncos in 1890.

March
March 11 – Eric McNair, 39, shortstop who played with the Philadelphia Athletics, Boston Red Sox, Chicago White Sox and Detroit Tigers during 14 seasons from 1929 to 1942, was a member of the 1930 World Series champion Athletics, led the American League in doubles with 47 in 1932, and also was a member of a 1934 All-American team that toured China, Japan and the Philippines, playing against teams in those countries.
March 15 – Bill Cissell, 45, middle infielder who played for the Chicago White Sox, Cleveland Indians, Boston Red Sox, Philadelphia Athletics and New York Giants during 10 seasons spanning 1928–1938.
March 18 – Rudy Sommers, 61, pitcher who played for the Chicago Cubs, Brooklyn Tip-Tops and Boston Red Sox over four seasons between 1912 and 1927. 
March 19 – Truck Eagan, 71, part-time infielder for the Pittsburgh Pirates and Cleveland Blues in the 1901 season. 
March 22 – Jake Livingstone, 69, Russian pitcher who played in 1901 with the New York Giants. 
March 25 – Jim Riley, 62, outfielder who appeared in just one game with the Boston Doves in 1910.
March 26 – Mike Jacobs, 72, shortstop who played five games for the Chicago Orphans in 1902. 
March 27 – Frank Gleich, 55, backup outfielder for the 1919–1920 New York Yankees
March 30 – Bill Bernhard, 78, one of the first pitchers to jump from the National League to the American League, who posted a combined record of 116–82 with a 3.04 earned run average in 231 games for the Philadelphia Phillies, Philadelphia Athletics and the Cleveland Bronchos/Naps from 1899 to 1907, including 23 wins and a 2.13 ERA for Cleveland in the 1904 season.

April
April   4 – George Suggs, 66, pitcher whose career spanned from 1908 through 1915, compiling a 99–91 record with a 3.11 ERA in 245 games with the  Detroit Tigers, Cincinnati Reds and Baltimore Terrapins,  including 20 wins in 1910 and 24 in 1914.
April   6 – Gene Madden, 59, who appeared as a pinch-hitter in one game for the Pittsburgh Pirates in 1916.
April 11 – Joe Buskey, 46, shortstop for the 1926 Philadelphia Phillies.
April 20 – John Murphy, 69, backup infielder who played from 1902 to 1903 for the St. Louis Cardinals and Detroit Tigers.
April 21 – Harry Morelock, 79, shortstop for the Philadelphia Phillies in the 1891 and 1892 seasons.
April 28 – Clay Touchstone, 46, pitcher who played for the Boston Braves and Chicago White Sox over parts of three seasons between 1928 and 1945.

May
May   6 – Charlie Hallstrom, 85, one of four big leaguers to have been born in Sweden. who pitched in just one game for the Providence Grays during the 1885 National League season. 
May   6 – Speed Kelly, 64, third baseman who played for the Washington Senators in 1909.
May   7 – James Durham, 67, pitcher for the Chicago White Sox in 1902. 
May   8 – Sam Breadon, 72, owner of the St. Louis Cardinals from 1920 to 1947.
May 14 – Mike Kahoe, 75, one of the first catchers to wear shin guards, who played for the Cincinnati Reds, Chicago Orphans, St. Louis Browns, Philadelphia Phillies, Chicago Cubs and Washington Senators in 10 seasons from 1895 to 1909. 
May 17 – Bill Swarback, 81, for the 1887 New York Giants.
May 24 – Joe Callahan, 32, pitcher who played for the Boston Bees in the 1939 to 1940 seasons.
May 27 – Jim Canavan, 82, who played some outfield and infield utility positions with the Cincinnati Kelly's Killers, Milwaukee Brewers, Chicago Colts, Cincinnati Reds and Brooklyn Bridegrooms in a span of five seasons from 1891–1897.
May 29 – Doc Scanlan, 68, who pitched with the Pittsburgh Pirates and Brooklyn Superbas/Dodgers during seven seasons between 1903 and 1911.

June
June   7 – Hi Bell, 51, pitcher who played for the St. Louis Cardinals and New York Giants in a span of eight seasons from 1924–1934, as well as a member of the Cardinals teams that won the World Series in 1926 and 1933 and the National League pennant in 1930.
June 11 – R. R. M. Carpenter, 71, co-owner (with his son) of the Philadelphia Phillies from November 23, 1943 until his death.
June 12 – Oliver Marcell, 53, African-American third baseman for a number of teams around the Negro leagues from 1918 through 1931, also a top-class hitter whose defensive skills took center stage by comparison. 
June 14 – Charley Moran, 71, who gained renown as both a catcher and umpire in Major League Baseball and as a collegiate and professional American football coach, while playing for the St. Louis Cardinals,  umpiring in the National League from 1918 to 1939, working in four World Series, and coaching football at several colleges.
June 15 – Nig Clarke, 66, Canadian catcher who played with the Detroit Tigers, Cleveland Naps, St. Louis Browns, Philadelphia Phillies and Pittsburgh Pirates over part of nine seasons between 1905 and 1920. 
June 15 – Jim Buchanan, pitcher for the 1905 St. Louis Browns of the American League.
June 16 – Jim Cook, 69, outfielder who played with the Chicago Cubs in the 1903 season. 
June 16 – Jerry Kane, 87, backup catcher for the 1890 St. Louis Browns of the National League. 
June 23 – John Godar, 84, outfielder for the 1892 Baltimore Orioles of the National League.
June 25 – Buck Freeman, 77, outfielder for the Washington Statesmen/Senators, Boston Beaneaters and Boston Americans in 10 seasons between 1891 and 1907, who led both the National League and American League in home runs, twice topped the American League in RBI, batted a .300 average four times, and was a member of the 1903 World Champion Boston Americans.

July
July   6 – Ike Caveney, 54, shortstop who played with the Cincinnati Reds from 1922 to 1925, and later became a player-manager for the PCL San Francisco Seals from 1932–1934.
July 10 – Red Downey, 60, outfielder for the 1909 Brooklyn Superbas of the National League. 
July 17 – Jack Slattery, 71, backup catcher who played for the Boston Americans, Cleveland Naps, Chicago White Sox, St. Louis Cardinals and Washington Senators in parts of four seasons from 1901–1909, and later managed the Boston Braves in 1928.
July 23 – John Anderson, 75, outfielder and first baseman and the first of only three big leaguers to have been born in Norway, who played for six teams in a 14 season-career between 1894 and 1908, slashing .290/.329/.405 through 1,636 games, while leading the National League with 22 triples and a .494 slugging average in 1898 and the American League with 39 stolen bases in 1906.

August
August 22 – Chief Zimmer, 88, catcher for 19 seasons, 13 with the Cleveland Spiders, batted .300 four times.
August 25 – Mule Watson, 52, who pitched from 1918 through 1924 for the Philadelphia Athletics, Boston Braves, Pittsburgh Pirates and New York Giants, as well as the last pitcher in Major League Baseball history to start both games of a doubleheader twice in the same season.

September
September   1 – Larry McClure, 64, outfielder for the 1910 New York Highlanders. 
September   9 – Len Madden, 59,  pitcher for the 1912 Chicago Cubs. 
September   9 – Hal Neubauer, 47, pitcher who played for the 1925 Boston Red Sox.
September 12 – Sherry Smith, 58, pitcher for the Pittsburgh Pirates, Brooklyn Robins and Cleveland Indians in a span of 14 season from 1911–1927, who is best known as the hard-luck loser in a pitching duel against Babe Ruth of the Boston Red Sox in the longest World Series game ever played — 14 innings in 1916 — when gave up an-out, RBI-single to Del Gainer that allowed Mike McNally to score the winning run in the eventual 2-1 loss. 
September 13 – Tim Jordan, 70, first baseman for the Washington Senators, New York Highlanders and Brooklyn Superbas over parts of ten seasons from 1901–1910, who led the National League in home runs in 1906 and 1908.  
September 14 – Billy Martin, 75, shortstop for the Boston Braves in the  1914 season.
September 15 – Heinie Beckendorf, 65, catcher who played with the Detroit Tigers from 1909 to 1910 and for the Washington Senators in 1910.
September 15 – Tiny Bonham, 36, All-Star pitcher who played for the New York Yankees and Pittsburgh Pirates during 10 seasons between 1940 and 1949; member of Yankees teams that won World Series titles in 1941 and 1943; died within three weeks of his final MLB appearance after undergoing abdominal surgery.  
September 18 – Roger Denzer, 77, pitcher who played with the Chicago Colts in 1897 and for the New York Giants in 1901.
September 18 – Charlie Malay, 70, second baseman for the 1905 Brooklyn Superbas.
September 21 – Buck Danner, 58, shortstop who played for the Philadelphia Athletics during the 1915 season.
September 22 – Matty Fitzgerald, 69, catcher who played from 1906 to 1907 for the New York Giants.

October
October   1 – Eddie Kolb, 69, pitcher whose only appearance in the majors was in the last game of the Cleveland Spiders in its 1899 season.
October   2 – Frank Schulte, 67, slugging right fielder for the Chicago Cubs teams from 1904–1916, who earned the first National League MVP Award in 1911, led the league in home runs twice and stole 233 bases in his career, including home plate 22 times.
October   3 – John Donahue, 55, right fielder for the 1923 Boston Red Sox.
October   6 – Robert E. Hannegan, 46, St. Louis political figure and former U.S. Postmaster General who was co-owner of the Cardinals (with Fred Saigh) from November 1947 to January 1949.
October   6 – Guy Zinn, 62, outfielder who played from 1911 through 1915 for the New York Highlanders, Boston Braves and Baltimore Terrapins.
October 14 – Huyler Westervelt, 80, 19th century pitcher who played for the New York Giants in 1894.
October 16 – Jack Ryan, 65, pitcher who played for the Cleveland Naps, Boston Red Sox and Brooklyn Dodgers during three seasons spanning 1908–1911, later a longtime pitching coach for the Red Sox.
October 19 – Bill Steele, 63, pitcher for the St. Louis Cardinals in five seasons from 1910–1914.
October 20 – Dick Rudolph, 62, spitball pitcher who played for the New York Giants and Boston Braves over 13 seasons from 1910–1927, posting a 121–108 career record with a 2.66 ERA, including two 20-win seasons and a World Series ring with the 1914 Miracle Braves – the first MLB club ever to win a World Series in just four games – while pitching complete-game victories in Games 1 and 4.
October 23 – Bill Burdick, 90, 19th century pitcher who played from 1888 to 1889 for the Indianapolis Hoosiers.
October 25 – Tim Bowden, 58, outfielder for the 1914 St. Louis Browns.
October 26 – Lou Mahaffey, 75, 19th century pitcher for Louisville Colonels of the National League in 1898, who later player for several minor league teams before joining the Pacific Coast League as an umpire in 1906.
October 29 – John Malarkey, 77, pitcher for the Washington Senators, Chicago Orphans and Boston Beaneaters of the National League over six seasons spanning 1894–1903, who is recognized as the only pitcher in MLB history to earn a victory by hitting his own walk-off home run, a solo shot against St. Louis Cardinals pitcher Mike O'Neill in the bottom of the 11th inning to give the Beaneaters a 4–3 victory on September 10, 1902 at Boston's South End Grounds.
October 31 – Jack Lundbom, 72, pitcher for the 1902 Cleveland Bronchos.

November
November   4 – Larry Douglas, pitcher who played in 1915 for the Baltimore Terrapins of the outlaw Federal League.
November   6 – Bill Richardson, 71, first baseman for the 1901 St. Louis Cardinals. 
November 11 – Brick Owens, 64, American League umpire from 1916 to 1937, who officiated in five World Series and the 1934 MLB All-Star Game.
November 14 – Artie Clarke, 89, utilityman whose main position was catcher, who appeared in 149 games for the New York Giants in the 1890 the 1891 seasons.
November 17 – Fred Hoey, 65, sportswriter and pioneering baseball broadcaster in Boston; radio voice of both the Braves (1925–1938) and Red Sox (1927–1938).
November 22 – Erv Brame, 48, good-hitting pitcher who posted a 52–37 won–lost mark from 1928 through 1932 for the Pittsburgh Pirates; batted .306 in 396 career at bats, with eight home runs and 75 RBI, and was frequently asked to pinch hit.
November 28 – Art Kruger, 68, backup outfielder who played with four teams in all or part of four seasons between 1907 and 1915, most prominently for the Kansas City Packers of the Federal League from 1914 to 1915.

December
December   1 – Hanson Horsey, 60, pitcher who played for the Cincinnati Reds in the 1912 season.
December   3 – Pete LePine, 73, Canadian outfielder and first baseman who appeared in 30 games for the Detroit Tigers in 1902.
December 13 – Orth Collins, 69, outfielder and pitcher who played with the New York Highlanders in the 1904 season and for the Washington Senators in 1909.
December 15 – Frank Hershey, 72, pitcher who appeared in just one game for the Boston Beaneaters in the 1905 season.
December 16 – Jack Himes, 71,  outfielder who played for the St. Louis Cardinals in the 1905 and 1906 seasons.
December 19 – Robert Gibson, 80, pitcher for the Chicago Colts and Pittsburgh Alleghenys during the 1890 National League season, who later became a federal judge.
December 21 – Teddy Kearns, 49, backup infielder who played with the Philadelphia Athletics in the 1920 season and for the Chicago Cubs from 1924 to 1925.
December 30 – Doc Watson, 64, pitcher who played with the Chicago Cubs in 1913 before joining the Chicago Chi-Feds and St. Louis Terriers clubs of the Federal League from 1914 to 1915.

Sources

External links

Baseball Reference – 1949 MLB Season Summary
Baseball Reference – MLB Players born in 1949
Baseball Reference – MLB Players died in 1949